Rohit Rajendra Havaldar (born in Kolhapur, Maharashtra, India) is an Indian swimmer. Rohit Havaldar has achieved many swimming records and has won many medals both at the nationals and state competitions. He competed in Telstra grand prix Olympic trials in July. He created history in 2010 when he won a medal for India in swimming at the South Asian games 2010.

Rohit was awarded Maharashtra government's most prestigious "Shiv Chhatrapati Award" in 2015 by the then Chief Minister, Devendra Fadnavis and Sports Minister, Vinod Tawde.

He was also awarded Karnataka government's most prestigious "Ekalavya Award" in 2006 by the then Governor of Karnataka, Late. Hansraj Bharadwaj and Sports Minister Shri. Gulihatty Shekhar.

Early life
Havaldar was born in Kolhapur in Maharashtra, India to Rajendra Havaldar (father) and Anuradha Havaldar (mother). He received his education at Jain University, Bangalore. At a very young age, he has shown the signs of fulfilling his energy.

References

External links 
 Rohit Havaldar's Personal Profile on swimming federation
 Rohit Havaldar hogs the limelight
 Rohit Havaldar Athlete Information
 Rohit Havaldar Facebook Profile

1989 births
Living people
Indian male swimmers
Indian male freestyle swimmers
Indian male backstroke swimmers
People from Kolhapur
Swimmers from Maharashtra
South Asian Games gold medalists for India
South Asian Games silver medalists for India
South Asian Games bronze medalists for India
South Asian Games medalists in swimming